Behind the Musik (A Boy Named Jonah) is the fourth studio album by rapper KJ-52. A deluxe edition was released, which included a bonus disk with more songs, music videos, and behind-the-scenes videos on the production of the record.

Awards
In 2006, the album was nominated for a Dove Award for Rap/Hip-Hop Album of the Year at the 37th GMA Dove Awards. The song "Are You Real?" was also nominated for Rap/Hip-Hop Recorded Song of the Year.

References

KJ-52 albums
2005 albums